Draeck (Draak) is the Old Dutch word for Dragon.

Places
 Vergulde Draeck

People
 Willem Draeck, Lord of Merksem (died 1525), Mayor of Antwerp

See also
 De Groene Draeck
 Gulden Draak
 Hotel de Draak
 Joris en de Draak

Dragons
Dutch legendary creatures